Georgios Valakakis was a Greek fencer.  He competed at the 1896 and 1906 Summer Olympics.

Valakakis competed in the amateur foil event.  He placed fourth of four in his preliminary group after losing all of his bouts, to Eugène-Henri Gravelotte, Konstantinos Komninos-Miliotis, and Athanasios Vouros. This put him in a tie for seventh overall, with Ioannis Poulos who was fourth in the other preliminary group.

References

External links

Year of birth missing
Year of death missing
Fencers at the 1896 Summer Olympics
19th-century sportsmen
Fencers at the 1906 Intercalated Games
Olympic fencers of Greece
Greek male fencers
Place of birth missing
Place of death missing